The 2017 Fórmula 3 Brasil season was the eleventh and final season of Fórmula 3 Brasil and the fourth since 1995, replacing the Formula 3 Sudamericana series as the highest-profile single-seater championship on the continent. In this season F3 Brasil will no longer with Stock Car Brasil and will be part of Porsche GT3 Cup Brasil event.

Drivers and teams

The following Brazilian teams (with the exception of British-based Hitech) and drivers are registered. All cars are powered by Berta engines and run on Pirelli tyres. This year Academy Class replacing class B.

Results and standings

Championship standings
Scoring system

External links
 

Formula 3 Brasil
Brasil
Brazilian Formula Three Championship
Brasil F3